Robert Carl Richardson, known as Bert Richardson (born 1956), is an American judge on the Texas Court of Criminal Appeals,  to which he was elected in 2014.

Early life

Born in San Antonio, Richardson's father was a United States Air Force fighter pilot, and the family moved frequently, living for periods in Argentina and in Europe. Richardson graduated from Judson High School in Converse, Texas, and received a B.A. from Brigham Young University, followed by a J.D. degree from St. Mary's University School of Law in San Antonio.

Legal career

Richardson became an Assistant District Attorney in the Bexar County district attorney's office in 1988, and in 1998 became an Assistant U.S. Attorney for the Western District of Texas in San Antonio. In 1999, Governor George W. Bush appointed Richardson to a seat on the 379th District Court. He remained on that office until 2008, when he lost a bid for reelection to Democrat, Ron Rangel. In 2014, Richardson presided as a special judge on call over the 2014 indictment of  Governor Rick Perry for alleged abuse of office. During the course of the proceedings, Richardson was elected to the Court of Criminal Appeals, and thereafter denied the motion to dismiss the case against the governor. Richardson won reelection in 2020.

References

External links
 Texas Courts: Judge Bert Richardson
 Texas Tribune: Judge Bert Richardson
 Campaign website
 Texas State Directory: Judge Bert Richardson
 

|-

1956 births
Living people
Brigham Young University alumni
Judson High School alumni
Lawyers from San Antonio
St. Mary's University School of Law alumni
Texas lawyers
Judges of the Texas Court of Criminal Appeals
Texas Republicans